Somerset County is a county in the state of Maine, in the United States. As of the 2020 census, the population was 50,477.  Its county seat is Skowhegan.

History 
Somerset County was established on March 1, 1809 from portions of Kennebec County and was named after Somerset County in England.

Government and politics
Somerset County is part of Maine's 2nd congressional district and represented by Democrat Jared Golden since 2019.

A 'swing' or 'pivot' county, despite voting for Barack Obama in the 2008 and 2012 presidential elections, Somerset County voted for Donald Trump in 2016 and 2020, most recently by a margin of victory of 23.37%.

Voter registration

|}

Geography 
It is the third-largest county in Maine by area.

Mountains 
 Boundary Bald Mountain
 Coburn Mountain
 Mount Bigelow
 Moxie Mountain
 Sandy Bay Mountain

Bodies of water 
 Carrabassett River
 Flagstaff Lake
 Kennebec River
 Moose River
 Moxie Falls

Major highways 

 Maine State Route 6
 Maine State Route 8
 Maine State Route 11
 Maine State Route 15
 Maine State Route 16
 Maine State Route 27
 Maine State Route 100
 Maine State Route 137
 U.S. Route 201
 Armstrong-Jackman Border Crossing
 U.S. Route 201A

Adjacent counties and municipalities 

 Aroostook County – north
 Penobscot County – east
 Piscataquis County – east
 Waldo County – southeast
 Kennebec County – south
 Franklin County – southwest
 Le Granit Regional County Municipality, Quebec – west
 Beauce-Sartigan Regional County Municipality, Quebec – west
 Les Etchemins Regional County Municipality, Quebec – northwest
 Montmagny Regional County Municipality, Quebec – northwest

Somerset County is one of few counties in the United States to border ten counties and county equivalents.

Demographics

2000 census 
As of the census of 2000, there were 50,888 people, 20,496 households, and 14,121 families living in the county.  The population density was 13 people per square mile (5/km2).  There were 28,222 housing units at an average density of 7 per square mile (3/km2).  The racial makeup of the county was 98.00% White, 0.24% Black or African American, 0.41% Native American, 0.34% Asian, 0.02% Pacific Islander, 0.11% from other races, and 0.89% from two or more races.  0.46% of the population were Hispanic or Latino of any race. 20.9% were of English, 17.7% French, 15.1% United States or American, 11.5% Irish and 8.8% French Canadian ancestry. 96.2% spoke English and 2.9% French as their first language.

There were 20,496 households, out of which 31.60% had children under the age of 18 living with them, 54.20% were married couples living together, 10.10% had a female householder with no husband present, and 31.10% were non-families. 24.60% of all households were made up of individuals, and 10.20% had someone living alone who was 65 years of age or older.  The average household size was 2.44 and the average family size was 2.87.

In the county, the population was spread out, with 24.70% under the age of 18, 7.00% from 18 to 24, 28.70% from 25 to 44, 25.30% from 45 to 64, and 14.30% who were 65 years of age or older.  The median age was 39 years. For every 100 females there were 96.00 males.  For every 100 females age 18 and over, there were 93.30 males.

The median income for a household in the county was $30,731, and the median income for a family was $36,464. Males had a median income of $29,032 versus $20,745 for females. The per capita income for the county was $15,474.  About 11.10% of families and 14.90% of the population were below the poverty line, including 19.40% of those under age 18 and 12.50% of those age 65 or over.

2010 census 
As of the 2010 United States Census, there were 52,228 people, 21,927 households, and 14,353 families living in the county. The racial makeup of the county was 97.1% white, 0.6% Asian, 0.5% American Indian, 0.4% black or African American, 0.1% from other races, and 1.3% from two or more races. Those of Hispanic or Latino origin made up 0.8% of the population. In terms of ancestry, 25.1% were French, 24.2% were English, 15.8% were Irish, 8.0% were German, 7.9% were American, and 6.1% were French Canadian.

Of the 21,927 households, 28.2% had children under the age of 18 living with them, 49.7% were married couples living together, 10.3% had a female householder with no husband present, 34.5% were non-families, and 26.9% of all households were made up of individuals. The average household size was 2.35 and the average family size was 2.80. The median age was 43.6 years.

The median income for a household in the county was $36,647 and the median income for a family was $47,177. Males had a median income of $41,235 versus $30,029 for females. The per capita income for the county was $20,709. About 14.0% of families and 18.4% of the population were below the poverty line, including 25.0% of those under age 18 and 12.7% of those age 65 or over.

Education

School administrative districts 
The following school districts are located at least partly in Somerset County:
 MSAD 4
 MSAD 12
 MSAD 13
 MSAD 49
 MSAD 53
 MSAD 54
 MSAD 59
 MSAD 74

Secondary schools 
 Carrabec High School – North Anson
 Faith Baptist Christian School – Skowhegan (serves multiple grades)
 Forest Hills Consolidated School (K-12) – Jackman
 Lawrence High School – Fairfield
 Madison Area Memorial High School – Madison
 Maine Academy of Natural Sciences – Hinckley
 Maine Central Institute – Pittsfield
 Skowhegan Area High School – Skowhegan
 Upper Kennebec Valley Memorial High School – Bingham

Higher education 
 Kennebec Valley Community College

Miscellaneous 
 Skowhegan School of Painting and Sculpture
 L.C. Bates Museum

Communities

Towns 

 Anson
 Athens
 Bingham
 Cambridge
 Canaan
 Caratunk
 Cornville
 Detroit
 Embden
 Fairfield
 Harmony
 Hartland
 Jackman
 Madison
 Mercer
 Moose River
 Moscow
 New Portland
 Norridgewock
 Palmyra
 Pittsfield
 Ripley
 St. Albans
 Skowhegan
 Smithfield
 Solon
 Starks

Census-designated places 
 Anson
 Bingham
 Fairfield
 Hartland
 Madison
 Norridgewock
 Pittsfield
 Skowhegan

Plantations 
 Brighton Plantation
 Dennistown
 Highland Plantation
 Pleasant Ridge Plantation
 The Forks
 West Forks

Unorganized territories 
 Central Somerset
 Northeast Somerset
 Northwest Somerset
 Seboomook Lake

Villages 
 Flagstaff
 North Anson
 Rockwood

See also 
 Historical U.S. Census Totals for Somerset County, Maine
 List of counties in Maine
 List of Maine county name etymologies
 List of towns in Somerset County
 :Category:People from Somerset County, Maine
 National Register of Historic Places listings in Somerset County, Maine

References

External links

County politics 
 
 

 
Maine counties
1809 establishments in Massachusetts
Populated places established in 1809
19th-century establishments in Maine